Cedrik-Marcel Stebe (born 9 October 1990) is a German professional tennis player. He reached his career-high singles ranking of world No. 71 in February 2012.

Career

2011: Grand Slam and Top 100 debut
He reached his first ATP World Tour quarterfinal at the 2011 MercedesCup in Stuttgart, Germany, where he beat Nikolay Davydenko and Fabio Fognini.

He was then awarded a wildcard to the 2011 International German Open where he beat Juan Carlos Ferrero and Davydenko again, before losing to Fernando Verdasco.

Stebe finished the year by winning the 2011 ATP Challenger Tour Finals.

2012: First and second Grand Slam wins
Stebe recorded his best Grand Slam result, when he got to the second round in the 2012 French Open.  He reached the same stage at the 2012 US Open (tennis).

At the 2012 Davis Cup World Group Play-offs he won the deciding rubber against former world No. 1 Lleyton Hewitt in straight sets.

2013-2014: Injury and hiatus
Stebe suffered a hip injury in the Heilbronn Open, and underwent surgery in October 2013. He expressed wishes to play competitive tennis again, but struggled with the recovery process.

2015
In February, he played his first tournament in almost a year and half, a Futures in Antalya, Turkey. He won his three qualifying matches and managed to enter the main draw. He would win two more matches before losing in the quarterfinals to Dimitar Kuzmanov.

2017: Return to ATP tour and top 100

At the Sofia Open, Stebe won his first ATP World Tour match for over three and a half years by beating Teymuraz Gabashvili in the first round. 

He won in the first round in 2017 Geneva Open against Jan-Lennard Struff as a lucky loser. He reached the quarterfinals, after the retirement of wildcard Janko Tipsarević in the second round, where he lost to Andrey Kuznetsov (tennis).

He finished the year ranked inside the top 100 at World No. 82.

2019: First ATP final 
Stebe reached his first ATP Tour final at the Swiss Open Gstaad, but lost to Albert Ramos Viñolas.

2022: First ATP match win in over a year
He qualified at the 2022 inaugural edition of the Dallas Open and won his first ATP main draw match in over a year against American Denis Kudla in three sets.

Singles performance timeline 

''Current through the 2023 Australian Open qualifying.

ATP career finals

Singles: 1 (1 runner-up)

ATP Challenger and ITF Futures finals

Singles: 18 (12 titles, 6 runner-ups)

Junior Grand Slam finals

Doubles: 1 (1 title)

Record against top 10 players
Stebe's match record against players who have been ranked in the top 10, with those who have been No. 1 in boldface. Only ATP Tour main draw and Davis Cup matches are considered.

  Nikolay Davydenko 2–0
  Juan Carlos Ferrero 1–0
  Fabio Fognini 1–0
  Janko Tipsarević 1–0
  Lleyton Hewitt 1–1
  Kevin Anderson 0–1
  Félix Auger-Aliassime 0–1
  Roberto Bautista Agut 0–1
  Grigor Dimitrov 0–1
  Novak Djokovic 0–1
  Roger Federer 0–1
  Richard Gasquet 0–1
  Karen Khachanov 0–1
  Juan Mónaco 0–1
  Kei Nishikori 0–1
  Milos Raonic 0–1
  Andrey Rublev 0–1
  Diego Schwartzman 0–1
  Denis Shapovalov 0–1
  Radek Štěpánek 0–1
  Fernando Verdasco 0–1
  Marin Čilić 0–2
  Jo-Wilfried Tsonga 0–2
  Stanislas Wawrinka 0–2

* .

National participation

Davis Cup (3–1)

References

External links
 
 
 
 

1990 births
Living people
People from Mühlacker
Sportspeople from Karlsruhe (region)
German male tennis players
US Open (tennis) junior champions
Grand Slam (tennis) champions in boys' doubles
Tennis people from Baden-Württemberg
21st-century German people